Kang Chang-Gi (Hangul: 강창기, Hanja: 姜昌基; 28 August 1927 – 5 January 2007) was a South Korean football midfielder who played for the South Korea in the 1954 FIFA World Cup. He also played for Seoul Football Club.

References

External links
FIFA profile

1927 births
South Korean footballers
South Korea international footballers
Association football midfielders
1954 FIFA World Cup players
2007 deaths
Asian Games medalists in football
Footballers at the 1954 Asian Games
Asian Games silver medalists for South Korea
Medalists at the 1954 Asian Games